Pierre Pagé, also spelled Pierre Page (born April 30, 1948), is a Canadian professional ice hockey coach and executive. He currently coaches EHC Red Bull München. He is also a former head coach in the National Hockey League (NHL).

Coaching career

Calgary Flames (1980-88)
Pagé started coaching at the age of 24 with Dalhousie University as an assistant coach. He became the head coach the following year, a position he held for seven years.

Page received his first job in the National Hockey League as an assistant coach with the Calgary Flames, working under head coach Al MacNeil. In 1980-81, his first season in the NHL and the Flames first in Calgary following their relocation from Atlanta in the summer of 1980, the club finished the season with a 39-27-14 record, earning 92 points and third place in the Patrick Division. In the post-season, the Flames swept the Chicago Black Hawks to win their first-ever playoff series in team history. Calgary then defeated the Philadelphia Flyers in seven games, however, they lost to the Minnesota North Stars in six games in the NHL semi-finals.

The Flames struggled in the 1981-82 season, as their record fell to 29-34-17, earning 75 points. The club did finish in third place in the Smythe Division, qualifying for the post-season. In the first round, Calgary was swept by the Vancouver Canucks. Following the season, the Page was named as head coach of the Flames newly created CHL affiliate, the Colorado Flames.

In 1982-83, the Colorado Flames finished with the second best record in the six team league with a record of 41-36-3, earning 85 points. In the post-season, Colorado lost to the Birmingham South Stars in six games in the CHL semi-finals.

Page remained with Colorado for the 1983-84 season, as the club finished with the best record in the league, going 48-25-3, earning 99 points. In the post-season, Colorado was upset by the Indianapolis Checkers in six games. Following the season, the CHL folded.

Page was named head coach of the Moncton Golden Flames of the American Hockey League for the 1984-85 season. The Golden Flames struggled to a 32-40-8 record, earning 72 points and finishing in last place in the North Division, failing to qualify for the post-season.

Page returned to the Calgary Flames as an assistant coach in 1985-86, working under head coach Bob Johnson. Calgary finished the regular season in second place in the Smythe Division, earning a record of 40-31-9 for 89 points. In the post-season, the Flames swept the Winnipeg Jets in the division semi-finals. In the division finals, the Flames upset the two-time defending Stanley Cup champions, the Edmonton Oilers, in a thrilling seven game series. Calgary won another seven game series in the Campbell Conference finals, defeating the St. Louis Blues, earning a berth into the 1986 Stanley Cup Finals against the Montreal Canadiens. The Flames lost the final round in five games.

Calgary had another excellent regular season in 1986-87, as the club improved to 95 points, earning a record of 46-31-3. In the playoffs, the Flames were upset by the Winnipeg Jets in the division semi-finals, losing in six games.

The Flames took another step forward in 1987-88, as the team finished with the best record in the National Hockey League, winning the Presidents' Trophy with a record of 48-23-9, earning 105 points. Calgary quickly defeated the Los Angeles Kings in the division semi-finals in five games, however, the team lost to the defending Stanley Cup champion Edmonton Oilers in four games in the division finals to end their season.

Following the season, Page left the Flames and was named head coach of the Minnesota North Stars.

Minnesota North Stars (1988-90)
Page took over the Minnesota North Stars as head coach for the 1988-89 season, taking over the worst team in the National Hockey League, as the North Stars had a record of 19-48-13 in the 1987-88 season.

On October 6, 1988, Page coached his first career game, losing to the St. Louis Blues by a score of 8-3. After a 0-4-0 start to the season, Page won his first career game, defeating the Boston Bruins on October 15 by a score of 5-1.

Under Page, the North Stars saw an improvement of 18 points, as the team finished his first season with a 27-37-16 record, earning 70 points and third place in the Norris Division. In the post-season, Minnesota lost to the St. Louis Blues in five games in the division semi-finals.

Minnesota saw some more improvement during the 1989-90, as the club improved by six points, registering a record of 36-40-4, earning 76 points. Despite the improvement, the North Stars dropped to fourth place in the Norris Division. In the playoffs, Minnesota nearly pulled off the upset against the top ranked Chicago Blackhawks in the division semi-finals, however, the club lost in seven games.

Following the season, Page resigned as head coach of the North Stars to become the general manager of the Quebec Nordiques.

Quebec Nordiques (1990-1994)
The Quebec Nordiques hired Page as general manager of the club on May 5, 1990. The Nordiques were the worst team in the NHL during the 1989-90 season, as they had a record of 12-61-7, earning 31 points. One of Page's first decisions was to not bring back head coach Michel Bergeron. Page hired Dave Chambers, who had been one of his assistant coaches with the Minnesota North Stars, to be the Nordiques head coach.

At the 1990 NHL Entry Draft, the Nordiques held the first overall selection, in which Page selected Owen Nolan from the Cornwall Royals of the OHL.

During the 1990-91 season, Page traded Michel Petit, Lucien DeBlois and Aaron Broten to the Toronto Maple Leafs in exchange for Scott Pearson and two second round draft picks, as the Nordiques continued their rebuild. Quebec finished the season with an improvement of 15 points from the previous season, however, Quebec's record of 16-50-14, earning 46 points, was still the worst in the league.

The Nordiques selected first overall at the 1991 NHL Entry Draft, as they picked Eric Lindros from the Oshawa Generals of the OHL. The Nordiques and Lindros could not come to a contract agreement, as Lindros opted to return to the Generals for the 1991-92 season.

Following a disappointing 3-14-1 start to the season, Page fired head coach Dave Chambers and named himself as the replacement, while retaining his general manager duties. In his first game as head coach of the Nordiques on November 18, 1991, Quebec lost 7-3 to the Pittsburgh Penguins. In his second game as head coach, the Nordiques defeated the Montreal Canadiens 5-2 for his first career win as head coach of the Nordiques. As the club continued to rebuild, Page traded away Ron Tugnutt and Brad Zavisha to the Edmonton Oilers for Martin Rucinsky and he traded Bryan Fogarty to the Pittsburgh Penguins for Scott Young at the trade deadline.

Quebec finished the 1991-92 season with a 20-48-12 record, earning 52 points, as the Nordiques once again failed to qualify for the playoffs. Page's head coaching record was 17-34-11 in 62 games.

On June 20, 1992, after not being to sign Eric Lindros, Page traded Lindros to the Philadelphia Flyers for Steve Duchesne, Ron Hextall, Kerry Huffman, Mike Ricci, Chris Simon, the rights to Peter Forsberg, a first-round draft pick in both 1993 and 1994, and $15 million.

With many new players in the lineup, the Nordiques improved dramatically in the 1992-93, as Quebec finished with a record of 47-27-10, earning 104 points, and saw an NHL record 52 point improvement over the previous season. The Nordiques finished in second place in the Adams Division and qualified for the post-season. In their first round match-up against their provincial rivals, the Montreal Canadiens, Quebec took an early 2-0 series lead. The Canadiens stormed back and won the next four games, eliminating Quebec.

The Nordiques had high expectations for the 1993-94 season. Injuries plagued Quebec throughout the season, and the team struggled to a 34-42-8 record, earning 76 points, and missing the playoffs. Following the season, Page was fired by the team.

Calgary Flames (1995-97)
Page returned to the Calgary Flames, as he was hired as head coach of the team on July 18, 1995. 

In his first game as head coach of the team, the Flames tied the Tampa Bay Lightning 3-3 on October 7. Following a very disappointing 0-7-3 start to the 1995-96 season, Page finally won his first game with Calgary on October 31, as the Flames defeated the Los Angeles Kings 2-1. Calgary continued to struggle throughout November, as the team had a record of 3-15-5 through their first 23 games. Page and the Flames turned their season around, as Calgary was able to finish in second place in the Pacific Division with a 34-37-11 record, earning 79 points, and a berth into the post-season. In the post-season, the Flames were swept by the Chicago Blackhawks in four games.

In his second season with Calgary in 1996-97, Page and the Flames struggled to a 32-41-9 record, earning 73 points and fifth place in the Pacific Division as Calgary failed to qualify for the post-season. Following the season, Page resigned as head coach of the Flames.

Anaheim Mighty Ducks (1997-98)
Page was hired as head coach of the Mighty Ducks of Anaheim for the 1997-98 season. In his first game as head coach, the Ducks lost to the Vancouver Canucks 3-2 in a neutral site game held in Tokyo, Japan on October 3. The next night, Page earned his first win, as Anaheim defeated Vancouver 3-2 in their second game held in Japan. The Mighty Ducks struggled during the season, finishing with a 26-43-13 record and sixth place in the Pacific Division, failing to qualify for the post-season.

On June 16, 1998, the Mighty Ducks fired Page as head coach.

Later career
After being dismissed by the Mighty Ducks, and out of hockey for one season, he continued his coaching career in Europe where he has coached in Switzerland (Ambrì-Piotta), Germany (Berlin Eisbären) and now in Austria. In Berlin, he led the club to its first two championships.

He is currently the Sporting Director and Head Coach of EC Red Bull Salzburg in the Erste Bank Hockey League in Austria. With Pagé behind the bench, the Red Bulls won the championship in 2008 and 2010 and finished second in 2009 in a close series against Klagenfurt. 2010 was the most successful year in the history of the EC Red Bull Salzburg. The team won their international pre-season tournament (Red Bull Salute), the Continental Cup (IIHF European Championship), and the Austrian Championship. Pagé spearheaded the IIDM—International Ice Hockey Development Model—in Salzburg with the Red Bulls, which aims to develop world class athletes with the help of the training facilities provided at the Thalgau training center.

Career positions
Source:

 1972–1973 - Dalhousie University (CIAU) - Assistant coach
 1973–1980 - Dalhousie University (CIAU) - Head coach
 1980–1982 - Calgary Flames (NHL) - Assistant coach
 1982–1984 - Colorado Flames (CHL) - Head coach
 1984–1985 - Moncton Golden Flames (AHL) - Head coach
 1985–1988 - Calgary Flames (NHL) - Assistant coach
 1988–1990 - Minnesota North Stars (NHL) - Head coach
 1990–1994 - Quebec Nordiques (NHL) - General manager
 1991–1994 - Quebec Nordiques (NHL) - Head coach
 1995–1997 - Calgary Flames (NHL) - Head coach
 1997–1998 - Mighty Ducks of Anaheim (NHL) - Head coach
 2000–2001 - HC Ambrì-Piotta (NLA/SUI) - Head coach
 2002–2007 - Eisbären Berlin (DEL) - Head coach
 2007–2013 - EC Red Bull Salzburg (EBEL) - Head coach
 2013–2014 - EHC Red Bull München (DEL) - Head coach

NHL coaching record

References

External links 
 
 EC Red Bull Salzburg

1948 births
Living people
Anaheim Ducks coaches
Calgary Flames coaches
French Quebecers
Ice hockey people from Quebec
Minnesota North Stars coaches
People from Laurentides
Quebec Nordiques executives
Quebec Nordiques coaches